Maksym Hubert Chudzicki (born 24 May 1999) is a Polish para table tennis player who won bronze in men's singles class 7 at the 2020 Paralympic Games.

References

Living people
1999 births
Paralympic table tennis players of Poland
Table tennis players at the 2020 Summer Paralympics
Medalists at the 2020 Summer Paralympics
Polish male table tennis players